The 1970–71 Pacific Tigers men's basketball team represented the University of Pacific during the 1970–71 NCAA Division I men's basketball season. Led by coach Dick Edwards, Pacific compiled a 22–6 record.

Center John Gianelli was the team's captain and leading scorer, averaging 21.4 points per game and 18.2 rebounds.

Schedule

|-
!colspan=9 style=| NCAA Tournament

References 

Pacific
Pacific Tigers men's basketball seasons
Pacific Tigers men's basketball
Pacific Tigers men's basketball